Civil disturbances in Western Australia include race riots, prison riots, and religious conflicts – often Protestant versus Catholic groups.

The earliest civil disturbances were actions by the local indigenous population dealing with European settlers.

Demonstrations and protests are linked to a range of issues over time.

In the convict era, there were collective actions by convicts. Organised labour had to deal with issues on the Goldfields in the 1890s and 1900s with demonstrations and protest actions, while in Perth these occurred in the 1960s and 1970s over war and race issues.

There are some incidents in the 19th century where the causes are less clear. A restricted press and limited means of some groups to gain avenues to express their grievances in a dominated society, means that some disturbances were suppressed literally and disguised in the public record.

In some cases some smaller disturbances (alcohol-related fights) in the Goldfields (Kalgoorlie, Boulder and Coolgardie for instance) would not be considered full-scale riots, but nonetheless the charges found either in newspaper or police records would suggest a significance beyond a simple incidence of drunken behaviour.

Incidents 
Many of these events/incidents are difficult to find from direct references, and require diligent examination of sources.  Some are unlikely to show up in newspaper reports at all. In some cases incidents need checking and more accurate dating.

 1834   - Race riots against Lascars (Portuguese creole stokers) - Perth
 1853   - Convicts on 'Phoebe Dunbar' - "a disturbance of a rather serious nature" while at anchor.
 1854 - Convicts riot over religious issue - Fremantle Prison. Prisoners revolted when mass was canceled due to the suspension of the Roman Catholic Chaplain for calling the Protestant Chaplain "an Agent of the Devil" during a sermon. Five prisoners received 100 lashes each as an example.
- see also Riots at Fremantle Prison between this date and 1988
 1894 - Riot at Mallina - Pilbara Goldfield - over Goldfield Warden Decision - 
 1897 - Riot after Catholics attacked Protestants during 12th July parade - Coolgardie
 1898 - Riot in September on leases -  Kalgoorlie
 1899 - Riot on Wharf during Lumper Strike - Fremantle
 1899 - Riot in September on leases over alluvial regulations made by '10 ft Ned' Wittenoom  - Kalgoorlie
 1901 - Conflict between Catholics and Protestants - Kalgoorlie
 1901 - Anti-Protestant conflict on 12 July - Boulder 12th July parade
 1905 - Race riots - between Chinese, Japanese, Malay - Broome
 1905-10? - Race riots Anti-Italian riots - Gwalia and Leonora
 1910 - Tramway Strike riots - Perth and East Perth
 1914 - Race riots - between Japanese, Malay - Broome
 1915 - Race riots - anti-German riot - Fremantle
 1916 - Anti-Greek riots - Perth (October), Kalgoorlie (December)
 1917 - Anti-Conscription riot - Cue
 1919 Fremantle Wharf riot
 1919 - Race riots - anti-Slav riot - Fremantle
 1919 - Inter union violence Kalgoorlie/Boulder
 1919 - Protests against increase in price of beer - Kalgoorlie 
 1920 - Broome race riots of 1920 - Japanese vs Malay and returned servicemen - Broome
 1922  - Demonstrations against Mitchell government
 1923 (1925?) - Hotel Workers Strike - Perth 
 1924/6 - Seamen's Strike - Fremantle
 1929 - Mutiny at Fremantle Prison over shaving - Fremantle
 1931 - 'Treasury Building' incident - Perth
 1934 - Anti-Italian/Slav riot - Kalgoorlie 
 1940/45 - American/Australian Servicemen incidents - various locations
 1944 - 11 April "Huge riot" in Fremantle High st involving 500-600 people
 1946 -  Pilbara Pastoral Strike meetings in Perth - broken up
 1947–55 - 'Cold War Violence' - incidents between CPA, and opponents and police - various locations
 1956+ - Dock strike scuffles and incidents     - Fremantle
 1967+ - Demonstration Anti Vietnam war events until the 1970s - various locations 
 1971  - Demonstration Anti Apartheid/Springbok Tour incidents - various locations
 1974+ - Demonstration "54b of Police Act" incidents          - various locations
 1988 - Fremantle prison riot and Fire - Fremantle
 2016 - Aboriginal protest - Kalgoorlie

See also 
 Race riot
 Racial violence in Australia

References

Further reading

History of Western Australia
Riots and civil disorder in Western Australia
Civil disturbances
Australia history-related lists